Ring-a-Ding-Ding! is a 1961 album by Frank Sinatra. It was the inaugural record on Sinatra's Reprise label and, as the initial concept was "an album without ballads", it consisted only of uptempo swing numbers.

The title track was written specifically for Sinatra by Sammy Cahn and Jimmy Van Heusen. The song "Have You Met Miss Jones?" was recorded for the album, though left off the final track listing. Ring-a-Ding-Ding! reached No. 4; it was given favorable reviews by Stereo Review, and, although a similar album (Sinatra's Swingin' Session!!!) was released by Capitol a mere two months prior, Ring-A-Ding-Ding! managed to maintain a 35-week stay on the charts. In the UK, the album reached No. 8 and stayed for 9 weeks on the chart.

The album was remastered and reissued by Concord Records on June 7, 2011, to mark its 50th Anniversary. The newest CD is an improvement on earlier releases as the original reverberation effect on Sinatra's voice has been decreased for a more natural sound.

Track listing

Selected personnel
 Frank Sinatra - vocals
 Johnny Mandel - arranger, conductor
 Felix Slatkin - conductor
 Don Fagerquist - trumpet
 John Anderson - trumpet
 Frank Rosolino - trombone
 Bud Shank - flute
 Bill Miller - piano
 Emil Richards - vibraphone

References

1961 albums
Albums arranged by Johnny Mandel
Albums conducted by Johnny Mandel
Albums conducted by Felix Slatkin
Frank Sinatra albums
Reprise Records albums
Concord Records albums